James Keough is a Canadian retired ice hockey goaltender who was an All-American for Michigan.

Career
After finishing his junior carrier with the St. Catharines Black Hawks, Keough was recruited to Michigan in 1965. After a year with the freshman team, Keough split time in net with the previous year's starter Harold Hermann. Keough, however, distinguished himself by allowing one fewer goal per game (3.00 versus 4.00) and swiftly took over the starting role in the Michigan cage. The Wolverines finished 4th in the WCHA but lost in the first round of the conference tournament to rival Michigan State.

The following year, with Keough starting 25 of 27 games, Michigan again finished 4th in the WCHA. Keough was named as an All-American, being seen as the major reason for the Wolverines being competitive in their conference, but he was not selected for either All-WCHA Team. Michigan was again defeated in the first round of the WCHA tournament but that didn't prevent Keough from again leading the team to a 4th place finish as a senior. In his third attempt, Keough finally won a postseason game, helping Michigan reach the second round, before being shelled 4–7 by WCHA champion Michigan Tech. Because Keough's first season was the same year that Michigan began consistently recording most goaltending stats, be set official school records in most categories. Hone of those marks currently stand.

After graduating, Keough played two years of professional hockey for the Fort Wayne Komets before retiring as a player. He returned to his alma mater in 1972 and served as an assistant coach for two seasons. Keough was elected to the Michigan Dekers Club Hall of Fame in 1978.

Personal life
Keough's son, Tim, was a goaltender for Michigan from 1988 through 1991.

Statistics

Regular season and playoffs

Awards and honors

References

External links

1946 births
Living people
Canadian ice hockey goaltenders
Ice hockey people from Toronto
Michigan Wolverines men's ice hockey players
Fort Wayne Komets players
AHCA Division I men's ice hockey All-Americans